The Cruachan Power Station (also known as the Cruachan Dam) is a pumped-storage hydroelectric power station in Argyll and Bute, Scotland. The scheme can provide 440 MW of power and produced 705 GWh in 2009.

It is one of only four pumped storage power stations in the UK, and is capable of providing a black start capability to the National Grid.

Construction began in 1959 to coincide with the Hunterston A nuclear power station in Ayrshire. Cruachan uses cheap off-peak electricity generated at night to pump water to the higher reservoir, which can then be released during the day to provide power as necessary. The power station is open to visitors, and around 50,000 tourists visit it each year.

Location
The power station is on the A85 road, about 8 km or 5 miles west of Dalmally, on a branch of Loch Awe leading to the River Awe, which is the outflow from the loch, at its NW corner. There is a seasonally open Falls of Cruachan railway station nearby.

History
Construction commenced in 1959, and the power station was opened by Queen Elizabeth II on 15 October 1965. The concept was designed by Sir Edward MacColl, who died before it opened. The civil engineering design of the scheme was carried out by James Williamson & Partners of Glasgow, and the main project contractors were William Tawse of Aberdeen and Edmund Nuttall of Camberley. Consulting electrical engineers were Merz & McLellan of Newcastle upon Tyne. At the peak of the construction, there were around 4,000 people working on the project.
About  in 2021 value.
Cruachan was one of the first reversible pumped-storage systems, where the same turbines are used as both pumps and generators. Previous pumped-storage systems used separate pumps with a network of pipes to return water to the upper reservoir, making them much more expensive to build than conventional hydroelectric systems. Cruachan is predated by the smaller  Lünerseewerk (de) of 1958 and the  Ffestiniog Power Station of 1963. It is one of four pumped storage schemes in the UK.

Its construction was linked to that of Hunterston A nuclear power station, to store surplus night-time nuclear generated electrical energy. The power station was originally operated by the North of Scotland Hydro-Electric Board, before being transferred to the South of Scotland Electricity Board. It was owned by Scottish Power from the privatisation of Britain's electricity industry in 1990 until Drax Group purchased it along with other Scottish Power assets on 1 January 2019.

Maintenance of the penstocks, which formerly required them to be drained, is now done using a remotely operated underwater vehicle.

To commemorate the 50th anniversary of the station's opening, a 2015 BBC radio documentary "Inside the Rock" covered the history of construction.

In June 2021, Drax applied to build a further 600 MW pumped storage capacity using the same reservoir, to a combined 1 GW for 7 hours of storage. Several financing modes are possible.

Design
The Cruachan station temporarily stores energy at times of low demand, and releases it at times of high demand, when electricity prices are higher, reducing the maximum power that must be provided by power stations. It is also used to cope with sudden surges in the demand for electricity, such as at the end of television programmes. Despite the use of some rainwater, Cruachan is not a net generator of electricity: it uses more energy for pumping water and spinning its turbines than it generates.

Around 10% of the energy from the station is generated from rainwater; the rest is from the water pumped up from Loch Awe.

It can go from standby to full production in two minutes, or thirty seconds if compressed air is used to start the turbines spinning. When the top reservoir is full, Cruachan can operate for 22 hours before the supply of water is exhausted.

The power station is required to keep a 12-hour emergency water supply in order to provide a black start capability to the National Grid, to enable utilities to be restarted without access to external power. It began supplying grid inertia in 2020.

Turbine hall
There are four Francis turbines, which operate as both pumps and generators.

The transformers step up the voltage from 16 kV to 275 kV for transmission. Six oil-filled cables carry the electric current up a cable shaft to a point in front of the dam, and from there it is carried on pylons to Dalmally  to the east. The staircase in the cable shaft has 1,420 steps, making it the tallest in Britain.

Reservoir
Environmental restrictions meant that the dam had to have a "clean" structure, so the operational equipment is located within the dam wall itself.

The penstocks underwent a major inspection and refurbishment in 2003.

Tourist attraction
The power station was listed by the conservation organisation DoCoMoMo as one of the sixty key monuments of post-war Scottish architecture. In November 2012, the power station received the Institution of Mechanical Engineers' Engineering Heritage Award.

A visitor centre, refurbished in 2009, is situated at the outflow to Loch Awe and receives around 50,000 visitors a year.

The power station houses a three-section  modernist mural in wood, plastic and gold leaf by English artist Elizabeth Falconer. The mural includes Celtic crosses, pylons, mythical beasts, and men of industry. The first section depicts the mythical Cailleach Bheur, who guarded the spring underneath the mountain. The middle panel commemorates fifteen workers killed when the roof of the turbine hall collapsed, and the final section shows the station working.

Popular culture
In the Disney+ Star Wars series Andor episode “S01:E06 The Eye", the Cruachan Power Station appeared as the Empire's supply hub on the planet Aldhani.

References

Sources

External links 

 
 

Dams completed in 1965
Energy infrastructure completed in 1965
Pumped-storage hydroelectric power stations in the United Kingdom
Hydroelectric power stations in Scotland
Buildings and structures in Argyll and Bute
Civil engineering